Yulin Fumian Airport is an airport serving the city of Yulin in Guangxi Zhuang Autonomous Region in south China. It is located in Shihe Town (石和), Fumian District of Yulin.

The airport has a  runway (class 4C) and a  terminal building. It is designed to serve 740,000 passengers annually. The airport opened on August 28, 2020.

Airlines and destinations

See also
List of airports in China
List of the busiest airports in China

References 

Airports in Guangxi